Mohammed Aman Al-Jahdali (born 8 September 1988) is a Saudi Arabian professional footballer who plays as a defender for Al-Entesar.

Honours
Al-Ahli
Saudi Professional League: 2015–16
King Cup: 2016
Crown Prince Cup: 2014–15
Saudi Super Cup: 2016

References

External links
 

Living people
1988 births
Saudi Arabian footballers
Association football defenders
Al-Ahli Saudi FC players
Al-Taawoun FC players
Al-Qadsiah FC players
Jeddah Club players
Al-Fateh SC players
Al-Entesar Club players
Sportspeople from Jeddah
Saudi Professional League players
Saudi Second Division players